Morang XI is a Nepali football club which played the National Football League in Nepal.
This club was formed in Biratnagar.
They reached the semi-finals of the Birat Gold Cup in February 2016.

Ground
The club official home ground is  Sahid Rangsala.

Honours
Birat Gold Cup 2072
Semi-Finals
Udayapur Gold Cup 2073
Runners-up
Falgunanda Gold Cup '''2074
Runners-up

Recent results

References

External links

Football clubs in Nepal
2013 establishments in Nepal